Ricky Molier (born 17 June 1976) is a Dutch wheelchair tennis player. At the 1996 Summer Paralympics he won the gold medal in the men's singles event and together with Eric Stuurman the bronze medal in the men's doubles event. Together with Robin Ammerlaan he also won the gold medal in the men's doubles event at the 2000 Summer Paralympics.

He was the ITF World Champion in men's wheelchair tennis in 1996, 1997 and 2001.

He won the gold medal at the Wheelchair Tennis Masters in the men's singles event in 1998 and 2001. In 2000 he finished in second place in this event. In 2000 he also won the gold medal in the men's doubles event together with Stephen Welch of the United States.

References

External links
 
 

1976 births
Living people
Place of birth missing (living people)
Dutch male tennis players
Wheelchair tennis players
Paralympic wheelchair tennis players of the Netherlands
Paralympic gold medalists for the Netherlands
Paralympic bronze medalists for the Netherlands
Paralympic medalists in wheelchair tennis
Medalists at the 1996 Summer Paralympics
Medalists at the 2000 Summer Paralympics
Wheelchair tennis players at the 1996 Summer Paralympics
Wheelchair tennis players at the 2000 Summer Paralympics
ITF World Champions
20th-century Dutch people
21st-century Dutch people